Garristown is a village in north-west Fingal, Ireland. It is also a civil parish in the historic barony of Balrothery West.

Location
Garristown is 18 km north of Swords, and around 7 km northeast from Ashbourne.  It is also a short distance from Ballymadun. It is located in hilly country, sloping down from west to east, with views towards the hills around the Naul. The village centre is 120m above sea level.

History
Records from 1200 show John Comyn, Archbishop of Dublin, granting the church at Garristown to the priory of Lanthony. William de Bardelby, later a senior judge, was parish priest here in 1318. The village is also recorded in the Down Survey (1654). The medieval church was later replaced by a Church of Ireland church.

Garristown's current street formation has not changed much since the Rocques map of County Dublin (ca. 1746). In 1837, the village had a population of 741, and the surrounding civil parish 2,801  There was a police station, a dispensary, a windmill and churches of both the Church of Ireland (with a ruined residence constructed in 1791) and the Roman Catholic Church (built in 1828), along with one national school for boys and two private schools. There were three fairs a year, and the area had natural resources in the form of stone and peat.

A new Roman Catholic church, the Church of Assumption, was dedicated on 10 June 1906.

The village today
The main street of Garristown runs north to south, with a tree-lined mall on the western side, and the central area where Main Street meets the Naul Road.  The population today is under 400 persons, and there is an active Community Council. The police barracks in the centre of the village dates from the 19th century, and the Carnegie Library, still operational, from the early 20th century. The library was renovated in the 2000s.

Other amenities include a primary school and a community centre, which was a secondary school, Garristown VEC, which, after closure, was acquired by the community council, and converted into a multi-purpose hall and ancillary facilities. This centre is used by sub-groups of the community council, the local branch of the Irish Countrywomen's Association, local scout groups (the 76th Garristown) and the youth club. There is a bottle bank near the entrance to the old churchyard opposite the butcher's shop.

The base of the local windmill also survives.

Amenities
Amenities include a public house, butcher's shop, small supermarket, hairdressing salon and a service station. The village is served by a Garda station.

The local Roman Catholic church, the Church of the Assumption, is in Garristown parish in the Fingal North deanery. There is also a former Church of Ireland church and cemetery.

Sport
The local GAA club, Garristown GFC, has its grounds to the east. It has 11 teams and a new clubhouse with a small gym. Other local groups include Garristown Gun Club and Garristown Historical Society and the Arena Airsoft Club.

Dublin Gaelic footballer Dean Rock is from the area.

Representation
Garristown is in the jurisdiction of Fingal County Council and is in the Dublin North Dáil Constituency. The village has been considered for further development, and in 2005, the County Council adopted an Urban Design Framework for an area immediately to the east of the village.

See also
 List of towns and villages in Ireland

External links
 Aerial video featuring some local history of Garristown

References and notes

Towns and villages in Fingal
Townlands of Fingal
Civil parishes of the barony of Balrothery West